Born to Run is a BBC six-part marathon racing drama series written by Debbie Horsfield, and that aired on BBC1 from 25 May to 29 June 1997, starring Keith Allen, John McArdle and Billie Whitelaw.

Cast and characters
 Keith Allen as Byron Flitch
 John McArdle as Eddie Gallagher
 Billie Whitelaw as Lillian "Lili" Flitch
 Crissy Rock as Edna
 Marian McLoughlin as Bron Flitch
 Terence Rigby as Burke Flitch
 Mike Eastman as Mechanic
 Rachel Davies as  Elayne Quigley
 William Ash as Samuel "Sammy" Flitch
 Kieran O'Brien as Ryan Flitch
 Mary Jo Randle as Teresa
 Peter Kay as Delivery driver

Episodes

Media releases
The complete series of Born to Run on DVD in a 2-disc set was released by Simply Media on 7 September 2015.

References

External links
 

1997 British television series debuts
1997 British television series endings
1990s British drama television series
BBC television dramas
1990s British sports television series
1990s British television miniseries
English-language television shows
Television shows set in Merseyside